Acacia stellaticeps, commonly known as the Northern star wattle, poverty bush and glistening wattle. Indigenous Australians the Nyangumarta peoples know the bush as pirrnyur or pirrinyurru and the Ngarla peoples know it as panmangu. It is a shrub of the genus Acacia and the subgenus Plurinerves.

Description
It has numerous slender main stems separating from each other at ground level that are covered in smooth or finely fissured, grey coloured bark. Like most species of Acacia it has phyllodes rather than true leaves. The dull-green to greyish green phyllodes have an asymmetrically elliptic-obovate shape and are usually slightly sigmoid. It blooms from October to May and produces yellow flowers.

Taxonomy
The species was first formally described by the botanists Peter Kodela, Mary Tindale and D.Keith in 2001 as part of the work Acacia stellaticeps (Fabaceae: Mimosoideae), a new species from the Pilbara, Western Australia, to Tanami, Northern Territory. as published by the world Nuytsia. It was  reclassified as Racosperma stellaticeps in 2003 by Leslie Pedley then transferred back to genus Acacia in 2006.

Distribution
It is native to an area in the Kimberley, Pilbara and northern Goldfields regions of Western Australia. It is commonly found on flats, plains and sand ridges where it grows in stony sandy or clay soils. It is mostly found from around the Exmouth Gulf in the south to around Broome in the north extending eastward into the Great Sandy Desert and the Tanami Desert in the Northern Territory. The shrub is usually found in soft spinifex communities especially those with Triodia pungens and Triodia epactia and in red sandy soils where A. stellaticeps can large, dense, pure stands.

See also
 List of Acacia species

References

stellaticeps
Acacias of Western Australia
Plants described in 2001
Taxa named by Mary Tindale
Flora of the Northern Territory